Nikolay Ivanovich Bogolyubov (22 October 1899 – 9 March 1980) was a Soviet actor born in Ivanovskoye, Russian Empire and a People's Artist of the RSFSR (1945). In 1933 he played in Boris Barnet's Okraina; in 1941, he was awarded the Stalin Prize.

Bogolyubov attended the studio school of the Ryazan town theater and joined its troupe in 1919. In 1923–1926, he studied at the 
school of the Theater of the Russian Federation (RSFSR) named after its director, Vsevolod Meyerhold. From 1938 to 1958, the actor belonged to the Moscow Art Theater.

Bogolyubov made his film debut in 1931 in Yakov Protazanov’s first sound picture Tommy (1931). He also appeared in Boris Barnet’s Outskirts (1933) as the Bolshevik Nikolai who is executed for initiating fraternization with the German enemy at the end of World War I.

Bogolyubov played the dogmatic Stalinist functionary, in Fridrikh Ermler’s Peasants (1935), where he was cast as Nikolai Mironovich, head of the Political Department, who gives his all to transform the “backward farmer’s psychology.” In 1937–1939, Ermler cast Bogolyubov with the role of Party leader Petr Shakhov in The Great Citizen, for which the actor received a Stalin Prize in 1941. He worked with leading Soviet directors, including Sergei Gerasimov (Seven Brave Men, 1936), the Vasilyev brothers (The Defense of Tsaritsyn, 1942, Stalin Prize), and Mikheil Chiaureli (The Vow, 1944; The Fall of Berlin, 1949). Because of his likeness to Marshall Kliment Voroshilov (1881–1969), he became his screen double, for example, in Igor Savchenko’s The Third Blow (1948).

Bogolyubov, who joined the Communist Party in 1950, received Stalin Prizes for his stage work in 1946, 1947, 1949, and 1950.

Partial filmography

 Tommy (1931)
 Outskirts (1933) - Nikolai Kadkin
 Krestyane (1935) - The District Commissar
 Seven Brave Men (1936) - Capt. Ilya Letnikov
 Na dalnem vostoke (1937) - Shtokman
 The Great Citizen (1938) - Shakhov - the great citizen
 The Oppenheim Family (1939) - Herman Weller
 Lenin in 1918 (1939) - K.E. Voroshilov (scenes deleted)
 The Golden Key (1939) - Captain of the airship
 Pervaya konnaya (1941) - Kliment Voroshilov
 The Defense of Tsaritsyn. 1 episode: Pokhod Voroshilova (1942) - Kliment Voroshilov
 Aleksandr Parkhomenko (1942) - Voroshilov
 Paren iz nashego goroda (1942) - Dr. Burmin
 The Defense of Tsaritsyn. 2nd episode: Oborona (1942) - Kliment Voroshilov
 Ona zashchishchaet rodinu (1943) - Ivan Lukyanov
 Partizany v stepyakh Ukrainy (1943) - Salyvon Chasnyk
 Novgorodtsy (1943) - Doronine
 Nebo Moskvy (1944) - Lt. Col. Balashev
 The Vow (1946) - Aleksandr, her eldest son
 Novyy dom (1947) - Vasiliy Fyodorovich
 Boy from the Outskirts (1948) - Stepan Shubin, factory director
 The Third Blow (1948) - K. E. Voroshilov
 The Fall of Berlin (1950) - Factory Superintendent Kumchinsky
 Zhukovsky (1950) - Captain Aleksandr Mozhaysky (uncredited)
 Velikaya sila (1950) - Ostroumov
 Opasnye tropy (1955) - Passazhir poezda
 Stranitsy bylogo (1957) - Savva
 Poyedinok (1957) - Osadchiy
 Sluchay na shakhte vosem (1958) - Krayev
 Uzaq Sähillärdä (1958) - Tinty
 Gori, moya zvezda! (1958) - Denis Davidovich
 Zhizn proshla mimo (1959) - podpolkovnik Panin
 Kosolapyy drug (1959) - Lesnov
 Silneye uragana (1960) - Shugayev
 Trizhdy voskresshiy (1960)
 Alyonka (1962) - Dmitri Prokofitch
 Generali da zizilebi (1963) - Field Marshal
 Walking the Streets of Moscow (1964)
 Liberation III: Direction of the Main Blow (1970) - Kliment Voroshilov (final film role)

References

External links

1899 births
1980 deaths
People from Lipetsk Oblast
People from Ryazan Governorate
Communist Party of the Soviet Union members
Soviet male film actors
Russian male film actors
Russian male silent film actors
People's Artists of the RSFSR
Stalin Prize winners
Recipients of the Order of Lenin